Drunken Tai Chi is a 1984 Hong Kong martial arts action film directed by Yuen Woo-ping. It is notable for being the acting debut of Donnie Yen, who had previously performed as a stuntman. The film showcases Yen's martial arts skills as well as his b-boying abilities, including a scene in which Yen performs a moonwalk.

Plot
A spoiled young man who is on the run from a ruthless killer finds accommodation with a puppeteer and his heavy-set wife. Both of them are masters of the art of tai chi, the only style of martial arts that can defeat the killer.

Cast 
Source:

 Donnie Yen
 Mandy Chan
 Lydia Shum
 Wong Tao
 Yuen Cheung Yan
 Yuen Hsin Yee

Reception
Reviewer Simon Rigg of kungfukingdom.com writes that while the film never reached the popularity of Drunken Master, "nevertheless it’s a great kung fu showcase in its own right. It’s an unconventional mix, featuring American crazes (skateboarding) and a killer with a very human side alongside a lot of slapstick and bawdy humour, but it’s impossible not to be taken in by Donnie and the team’s set-pieces. It holds a special place in Hong Kong film history for bringing Donnie Yen to the fore and as one of the last films to feature step-by-step intricate choreography."

The book The Encyclopedia of Martial Arts Movies by Bill Palmer, Karen Palmer, and Ric Meyers calls the film a "commonplace, simple story of revenge with humorous touches", noting its "great kung fu! The Yuen family is listed as the fight choreographers, and that usually means a cornucopia of visual effects and breathtaking martial arts. They don't let us down here." The film is given a rating of 3 1/2 stars.

References

External links

1984 films
1984 action films
1984 martial arts films
Hong Kong action comedy films
Hong Kong martial arts films
Martial arts comedy films
Kung fu films
Tai chi films
Films directed by Yuen Woo-ping
1980s Hong Kong films